The Bosniak National Council is a representative body of the Bosniak national minority in Serbia. It was founded as the Muslim National Council of Sandžak (MNVS) on 11 May 1991. Its first president and founder is Sulejman Ugljanin. Until 2003, the Bosniak National Council was called the Bosniak National Council of Sandžak (BNVS), after which it took its current name.

Throughout the 1990s, it actively sought autonomy for the Sandžak region and its eventual unification with the Republic of Bosnia and Herzegovina. Following Montenegro's independence in 2006, it remained active only in Serbia.

The Bosniak National Council has 35 seats, while the representatives are being elected at the elections for the national councils of various recognised national minorities in Serbia. The last election was held in November 2018, in which most of seats were won by the Party of Democratic Action of Sandžak, led by Sulejman Ugljanin.

History

1991–2000

The Muslim National Council of Sandžak (MNVS) was founded in Novi Pazar on 11 May 1991. Sulejman Ugljanin was elected its first president. The MNVS consisted of the Party of Democratic Action of Sandžak (SDAS) and other Bosniak political parties, as well as other associations, the Muslim religious community and non-party individuals.

On 11 May 1991, the MNVS declared that the governments of Serbia and Montenegro were pushing "Greater Serbian ideology" and seeking the "physical extermination" of the Sandžak Muslims so that the land border between Serbs in Serbia and Montenegro could be completely unimpeded. It claimed to be the only legitimate representative of the Sandžak Muslims. The MNVS sought autonomy for the Sandžak should Yugoslavia dissolve and called for Muslims to arm themselves in the case of a civil war. It announced the formation of an assembly, an executive council, public security services and the implementation of the compulsory military service, promising the suspension of every other Yugoslav state body in the case of a dissolution of Yugoslavia or a civil war.

Between 25 and 27 October 1991, the MNVS organised a referendum for the autonomy of Sandžak asking Muslims whether they were in favour of "full political and territorial autonomy" of the region and its "right to join one of the sovereign republics", presumably Bosnia and Herzegovina. Serbian authorities declared the referendum unconstitutional. The referendum was organised with the support from the Bosnian Party of Democratic Action (SDA), although this was denied by the MNVS. The MNVS claimed that 264,000 people in Sandžak, the rest of Yugoslavia and abroad asked to be included on the voter list. The turnout was 71 percent, and 98 percent voted in favour of the political and territorial autonomy of the Sandžak with the right of joining another one of Yugoslavia's republics. Ugljanin claimed that 97 percent of Sandžak Muslims and 33 percent of Albanians participated in the referendum, but hardly any Christians. He also said that the MNVS would decide on which Yugoslav republic Sandžak would join, depending on further developments.

In late November 1991 the MNVS selected a new administration for the region which acted as a shadow government. The secretary of the Party of Democratic Action of Sandžak, Rasim Ljajić, was named prime minister, while Ugljanin remained the president of the MNVS. The SDA maintained a majority of seats in the new government, which also included the Liberal Bosniak Organisation and the Party of National Equity. Also in January 1992, the MNVS adopted a resolution calling the Sandžak Muslims to oppose the recruitment for the Yugoslav People's Army (JNA).

After the European Community recognized the secession of several former Yugoslav republics in December 1991, Ugljanin sent the results of the referendum to Dutch Foreign Minister Hans van den Broek asking for "the recognition and full international and legal subjectivity of Sandžak". In January 1992, the MNVS declared the creation of a "special status" for the Sandžak that would grant the region a far-reaching autonomy. The initiative wasn't recognised by the Yugoslav or Serbian governments. In a follow-up letter to the European Ministerial Council of 5 April 1992, Ugljanin, under the impact of the imminent foundation of the Federal Republic of Yugoslavia (founded after Slovenia, Croatia, Bosnia and Herzegovina and Macedonia left the country's previous incarnation), and referring to the Bosnian War, asked again for the recognition of Sandžak, as well as the deployment of UN troops and the establishment of an international presence in the region.

On 18 April, a Conference of Muslim Intellectuals of Sandžak, Montenegro and Serbia protested against the foundation of the Federal Republic of Yugoslavia, saying it occurred against the will of the country's Muslim and calling for its non-recognition. The MNVS adopted a resolution on 28 April denying the existence of Yugoslavia and insisting that the Muslims of Sandžak be allowed to join the republic of their choice, which in this case was the Muslim-dominated Republic of Bosnia and Herzegovina. On 16 August 1992, the MNVS went a step further. Referring to their imminent participation in the London Conference of August 1992, the MNVS announced a total boycott of Serbia and Montenegro, including their republican assemblies, until the Sandžak was granted official status and "state terrorism" ended. The MNVS called for a boycott of the early parliamentary elections of May 1992, December 1992 and December 1993. Most Muslims did not participate in the elections, nor did the Albanians in Kosovo.

On 6 June 1993, the MNVS adopted the Memorandum on the Establishment of Special Status for Sandžak inside the Rump Yugoslavia (Serbia and Montenegro), which sought far-reaching autonomy. The Memorandum, which was envisaged as being signed by Yugoslavia, the MNVS, the Republic of Bosnia and Herzegovina and the International Conference on the Former Yugoslavia (ICFY), remained a dead letter.

In 1996, Sandžak Muslim parties and associations adopted the name "Bosniaks" instead of "Muslims" after the same decision of the Congress of Bosniak Intellectuals held in Sarajevo in 1993. Therefore, the name of the MNVS was changed to the Bosniak Muslim National Council of Sandžak (BNVS). After end of the Bosnian War in 1995, the renamed Bosniac National Council of Sandžak adopted the Memorandum on Autonomy of Sandžak and Special Relations with Bosnia and Herzegovina on 19 July 1999. During the 2000 presidential election held in September, the BNVS supported the Democratic Opposition of Serbia, calling Bosniaks to vote for a joint candidate of the opposition. The election culminated in the overthrow of Slobodan Milošević during the so-called Bulldozer Revolution.

2000–present

In these new circumstances, the status of national minorities in Serbia and Montenegro was legally regulated. On 6 September 2003, the BNVS held an electoral assembly in Novi Pazar; Sulejman Ugljanin was re-elected president. During the Assembly, the Bosniac National Council of Sandžak was suspended, and, in accordance with the new law, the Bosniac National Council (BNV) started functioning. The Statute of the Bosniac National Council, adopted on 13 September 2003, described the Bosniac National Council as the highest representative body of the Bosniak national minority in Serbia. It had jurisdiction in the use of language and script, education, culture and information on Bosnian language. Among the most important decisions of the Bosniac National Council were those determining the national flag and the coat of arms of the Bosniak national minority, its national holidays, national awards and acknowledgments and national manifestations. Following Montenegro's independence in 2006, the Bosniac National Council remained active only in Serbia.

In 2009, the Bosniac National Council participated in the creation of the draft of the Law on National Councils of National Minorities, which improved protection mechanism of the national minorities in Serbia. The Bosniac National Council issued the Declaration on Status of the Bosniaks of Sandžak in the Republic of Serbia on 27 June 2009. In the Declaration, the Bosniac National Council warned the Serbian authorities about alleged halt in the process of the consummation of collective rights of the Bosniak national minority. Later, the Bosniac National Council adopted the Decision on Determining Traditional Names of the Units of the Local Self-Administration, Populated Places and Other Geographical Names in the Bosnian Language on the territory of Novi Pazar, Tutin, Sjenica and Prijepolje. The Bosniac National Council created the Model for Education of the Bosniaks of Sandžak, the Strategy of Informing on Bosnian Language, and founded the Institute for Culture.

An unsuccessful election for the new composition of the Bosniac National Council was held on 6 June 2010, after which the old leadership continued to lead the Council. This led to the new halt in the relations between the Council and Serbian authorities, after which the Council adopted the Resolution on Status and Consummation of Rights of the Bosniak people in Serbia on 1 March 2012, and later the Declaration to the Bosniak People and Citizens of Sandžak as an instruction to the Bosniak political parties and associations to carry out a pressure on the Serbian authorities. On 6 April 2012, the Bosniac National Council adopted the national anthem of the Bosniak national minority called "Ja sin sam tvoj" (I'm your son).

The first elections for the national councils of various national minorities in Serbia were held in October 2014. The turnout for the Bosniac National Council was 35.7 percent. Most of the seats were won by the coalition led by the Party of Democratic Action of Sandžak, which gained 19 representatives, while the opposing coalition under Mufti Muamer Zukorlić won 16 seats.

References

Notes

Books

News reports

Other sources

 
 

Bosniaks of Serbia
Sandžak
Novi Pazar
1991 establishments in Serbia
Organizations established in 1991